Eluru revenue division (or Eluru division) is an administrative division in the Eluru district of the Indian state of Andhra Pradesh. It is one of the 3 revenue divisions in the district which consists of 12 mandals under its administration. Eluru city is the divisional headquarters.

History 
The history of the division dates back to Britishers rule in India, when it has its existence. The present sixteen mandals became part of the division on 25 May 1985.

Demographics 
 census, the division has a total population of 14,71,367. It includes, 7,35,180 males and 7,36,187 females. The total urban population in the division is 3,18,095.

Administration 
The division comprise 373 revenue villages, 342 gram panchayats and two municipalities of Eluru and Tadepalligudem.

The mandals administered under Eluru revenue division are:

See also 
List of revenue divisions in Andhra Pradesh
List of mandals in Andhra Pradesh

References 

Revenue divisions in Eluru district